I Quit may refer to:
 a phrase used by people to signify they resign, or wish to cease what they are doing
 "I quit" match, a professional wrestling match type
 a song performed by Hepburn
 a song performed by Bros, on the album Push
 a song performed by AJ McLean, on the album Have It All
 a song by The Jealous Girlfriends from the album The Jealous Girlfriends